Parliamentary elections were held in Greece on 11 May 1958. The result was a second consecutive victory for Konstantinos Karamanlis and his National Radical Union, which won 171 of the 300 seats in Parliament.

Background
Although Karamanlis could have a parliamentary majority, he preferred to go for elections, in order to achieve a renewed public support.

The pretext of the defection was a new electoral law that Karamanlis passed. Rallis was opposed to the law, thinking that it is going to be extremely favorable for EDA, a party believed to be linked with the then-banned Communist Party of Greece.

The outcome of the results proved that Rallis' "fears" were justified. EDA became the second biggest party, outvoting a divided centre.

Just after the elections Karamanlis formed a new government, taking back in his party the defectors.

Results

Aftermath
The unexpected rise of EDA, barely nine years after the end of the Greek Civil War, sent alarms through the right-wing establishment, and measures were taken to combat the emergent "communist threat", including the division of the large urban electoral districts of Athens, Piraeus and Thessaloniki so that the left-voting areas would be separated (forming the Athens B, Piraeus B, etc. constituencies), as well as the establishment of a dedicated domestic security agency, the General Directorate of National Security.

References

Parliamentary elections in Greece
Legislative election
1950s in Greek politics
Greece
Greece
Legl
Konstantinos Karamanlis